Lake Victoria Serena Resort is a 5-star hotel in Lweeza, in Wakiso District, in Uganda, on the shores of Lake Victoria, Africa's largest fresh-water lake.

Location
The resort is located on the Lweeza-Kigo Road, in Lweeza, Kigo Zone, in the parliamentary constituency of Kyaddondo County South, in Wakiso District, in Central Uganda, along the northwestern shores of Lake Victoria. The coordinates of the hotel are:00 11 55N, 32 35 55E (Latitude:0.198610; Longitude:32.598610).

Overview
Lake Victoria Serena Resort is a 5 star resort hotel operated by the Serena Hotels Group. It is the second property in Uganda, under the Serena brand. The flagship hotel in the country, operated by the group, is the 5-star Kampala Serena Hotel, located on Nakasero Hill, in central Kampala, Uganda's capital city.

Acquired in 2006, Lake Victoria Serena Resort is undergoing expansion and renovations. When completed, it will consist of 124 individual rooms, including ten suites, of which two are presidential suites. The hotel will also have its own helipad for easy transition between the hotel, Entebbe International Airport, and the Kampala Serena Hotel, in the center of Kampala. Other planned amenities include a golf course, a marina, a conference center and a luxury residential complex. The entire resort sits on a prime lake-shore piece of real estate that measures an estimated .

Ownership
The Kampala Serena Hotel is owned by a Pearl Development Group, a private company, and is managed by the Serena Hotels Group.

See also
 List of hotels in Uganda

External links
 Location of Lake Victoria Serena Resort At Google Maps
 TPS East Africa to Acquire TPS Uganda
 Homepage
 Profile at Wikimapia.org

References

Hotels in Uganda
Wakiso District
Hotel buildings completed in 2009